John Wilton Nelson (born December 6, 1941, San José, Costa Rica, of American parents) is an American conductor.  His parents were Protestant missionaries.

Nelson studied at Wheaton College and later at the Juilliard School of Music with Jean Morel.  Nelson was music director of the Greenwich Philharmonia and the New Jersey Pro Arte, and also served on the conducting staff of the Metropolitan Opera.  In 1972, he conducted his New York City opera debut at Carnegie Hall in an uncut performance of Berlioz's Les Troyens.  With the Metropolitan Opera, his professional opera conducting debut was also with Les Troyens, on one day's notice as an emergency substitute for Rafael Kubelík.

Nelson was music director of the Indianapolis Symphony Orchestra from 1976 to 1987, making commercial recordings there of music by Ellen Taaffe Zwilich and Charles Martin Loeffler for New World Records.  With Opera Theatre of Saint Louis, he was music director from 1985 to 1988, and principal conductor from 1988 to 1991. He was also music director of the Caramoor Festival in Katonah, New York, from 1983 to 1990. In 1998, Nelson became music director of the Ensemble Orchestral de Paris (now renamed the Orchestre de chambre de Paris), a position he retained for ten years.

Nelson's interest in choral music led to his position as artistic director of Soli Deo Gloria.

Nelson and his wife Anita had two daughters, Kari, and Kirsten. Anita Nelson died in October 2012.  Nelson now lives in Florida with his daughter, Kirsten, and her family, as well as in Costa Rica.

Selected recordings 

 George Frideric Handel, Semele, Kathleen Battle, Marilyn Horne, Samuel Ramey, John Aler, Sylvia McNair, Michael Chance, Ambrosian Opera Chorus, English Chamber Orchestra, CD Deutsche Grammophon Gesellschaft, 1992.
 Hector Berlioz, Benvenuto Cellini, Gregory Kunde, Benvenuto Cellini, Patrizia Ciofi, Teresa, Laurent Naouri, Balducci, Joyce DiDonato, Ascanio, Jean-François Lapointe, Fieramosca, Renaud Délègue, Le Pape Clément VII, Choeur de Radio France, Orchestre National de France, conducted by John Nelson, 3 CD Erato Warner classics 2004
 Hector Berlioz, Te Deum, Roberto Alagna, ténor, Marie Claire Alain, orgue, Chœur de l'Orchestre de Paris, Orchestre de Paris, conducted by John Nelson. CD Virgin classics 2001 report Warner classics 2013.
Hector Berlioz, Béatrice et Bénédict, Susan Graham- Béatrice, Jean-Luc Viala- Bénédict, Philippe Magnant- Léonato, Sylvia McNair- Héro, Gabriel Bacquier- Somarone, Gilles Cachemaille- Claudio, Catherine Robbin- Ursulle, Choeur et Orchestre de l'Opéra de Lyon, conducted by John Nelson. 2 CD Erato 1992 report Erato Warner classics 2011. 
Johann Sebastian Bach, Messe en si (à Notre Dame de Paris), Ruth Ziesak, Joyce DiDonato, Daniel Taylor, Paul Agnew, Dietrich Henschel, Ensemble Orchestral de Paris, Maîtrise Notre Dame de Paris, conducted by John Nelson. DVD Virgin classics 2006.
 Hector Berlioz, Les Troyens, Joyce DiDonato- Didon, Marie-Nicole Lemieux- Cassandre, Stéphane Degout- Chorèbe, Michael Spyres- Enée, Cyrille Dubois- Iopas, Mariane Crebassa- Ascagne, Nicolas Courjal- Narbal, Les Chœurs de l'Opéra National du Rhin, Badischer Staatsopernchor, Orchestre philharmonique de Strasbourg, conducted by John Nelson. 4 CD + 1 DVD Warner 2017. Diapason d'or, Choc de Classica.
Hector Berlioz, Requiem, Michael Spyres, ténor, London Philharmonic Choir,, Philharmonia Chorus, Philharmonia Orchestra, conducted by John Nelson. 2 CD + 1 DVD Erato 2019. Choc de Classica.
 Hector Berlioz, La Damnation de Faust, Michael Spyres- Faust, Joyce DiDonato- Marguerite, Nicolas Courjal- Méphistophélès, Alexandre Duhamel- Brander, Les Petits Chanteurs de Strasbourg, Maîtrise de l'Opéra national du Rhin, Orchestre philharmonique de Strasbourg, conducted by John Nelson. 2 CD + 1 DVD Warner classics 2019. Diapason d'or.
 Saint-Saëns, Cello concerto n°1, Lalo, Cello concerto,  Fauré, Élégie, Boëllmann, Variations symphoniques. Marc Coppey, cello, Orchestre philharmonique de Strasbourg, conducted by John Nelson. CD Audite 2021
 Hector Berlioz, Les Nuits d’été, Michael Spyres, tenor, Harold en Italie, Thimothy Ridout, violin, Orchestre Philarmonique de Strasbourg, conducted by John Nelson. CD Erato 2022

References

External links
 Indianapolis Symphony Orchestra, discography from orchestra website through 1997.
 Culture Kiosque, on-line interview article with John Nelson by Joel Kasow, July 21, 1997.
 John Nelson Blog
 Interview with John Nelson, October 4, 1993.

Living people
American male conductors (music)
1941 births
Grammy Award winners
Wheaton College (Illinois) alumni
People from San José, Costa Rica
21st-century American conductors (music)
21st-century American male musicians